The IAAF Grand Prix was an annual, global circuit of one-day outdoor track and field competitions organized by the International Association of Athletics Federations (IAAF). It was created in 1985 as the IAAF's first seasonal track and field circuit and lasted until 2009. Athletes scored points based on their performances on the circuit and the top athletes were invited to the annual IAAF Grand Prix Final. 

The IAAF Grand Prix expanded over its lifetime to incorporate the IAAF Golden League, the IAAF Super Grand Prix, IAAF Grand Prix and IAAF Grand Prix II. IAAF/Area Permit Meetings were also attached to the series, allowing athletes to score additional points in certain events at lower level meetings. In 2003 the series concept was renamed at the IAAF World Outdoor Meetings and the Grand Prix was reduced to a single tier of competitions within that tour. The series was again folded into the IAAF World Athletics Tour upon its creation in 2006, before being rendered defunct by the introduction of the IAAF Diamond League and IAAF World Challenge in 2010.

History
Created in 1985, the IAAF Grand Prix was the first global series of outdoor invitational track and field meetings organised by the IAAF. It followed on from the IAAF Golden Events (1978–82), where the IAAF helped finance meetings between the world's top athletes to encourage seasonal engagement with the sport outside of the Olympic cycle. The creation of the IAAF Grand Prix circuit came two years after the first World Championships in Athletics in 1983, highlighting the sports governing body's pivot to a more direct role in organising athletics competitions.

From 1985 to 1992 the series featured Grand Prix Meetings and IAAF Permit Meetings. The series culminated in the IAAF Grand Prix Final, which athletes gained qualification to based on their performances at the series' meetings. The competing athletes at the final earned additional points for their performances there, and the series winner of each event was the athlete with the highest score (as opposed to the Grand Prix Final event winner). In 1993 the Grand Prix format was amended so that the event winner was the first place athlete at the Final competitions, rather than the seasonal points leader, and this format continued until the last Grand Prix Final in 2002. 

In 1993 the IAAF Council approved a new tier of IAAF Grand Prix II meetings, which Permit-level meetings could apply for after two years. That same year four of the Grand Prix meetings (Oslo, Zurich, Brussels and Berlin) organised a Golden Four group of top-level European meetings within the series. In response, the IAAF Grand Prix series was again expanded with the foundation of the IAAF Golden League in 1998, which split out the Golden Four meetings (plus the Herculis and Golden Gala meets) as a new top tier within the IAAF Grand Prix circuit. After this point, the IAAF Grand Prix referred to multiple concepts in that it was both an annual series of track and field meetings incorporating four tiers (the IAAF Golden League, IAAF Grand Prix, IAAF Grand Prix II and Area Permit Meetings) as well as a term to refer to the second and third tiers of that series. In 2003, an IAAF Super Grand Prix level was added to the circuit, the IAAF Permit Meeting tier was dropped, and the Grand Prix Final was replaced with the IAAF World Athletics Final.

In 2003 the IAAF World Outdoor Meetings brand superseded the IAAF Grand Prix to the umbrella series concept and Grand Prix levels I and II continued within that series. In 2006, the IAAF World Athletics Tour was formed to replace the World Outdoor Meetings and at this time the IAAF Grand Prix II tier was dropped in favour of an Area Permit Meeting structure. The IAAF Grand Prix was made defunct along with the World Athletics Tour in 2010, as both were replaced by the IAAF Diamond League and IAAF World Challenge series.

Editions
The IAAF Grand Prix calendar was subject to change during its lifetime, with the number of meetings, the constituent meetings, the categorisation of meetings, and the duration of the series all regularly changing from year to year. Athletes received points based on their performances at the meetings on the circuit, with more points being given at the more prestigious and competitive competitions. From 2006 to 2009, series points could also be scored in certain events at Area Permit Meeting qualifiers (APM-Qs), although the meetings themselves were not considered a formal part of the meeting series. 

A total of seven meeting categories existed over the lifetime of the circuit:

 GL : IAAF Golden League
 SGP : IAAF Super Grand Prix
 GP : IAAF Grand Prix
 GP2 : IAAF Grand Prix 2
 GPF : IAAF Grand Prix Final
 WAF : IAAF World Athletics Final
 PM : IAAF/Area Permit Meeting

Key:

Meetings

The South African meet was held in Johannesburg in 1998 and Roodepoort in 1999
The second British meet was held in Sheffield in 1998, 2002 and 2007
The 1998–2001 Grande Premio Brasil Caixa de Atletismo was held in Rio de Janeiro
The 2003 Athens Grand Prix Tsiklitiria was held in Trikala
The 2003 Adidas Oregon Track Classic was held in Gresham, Oregon
The 2003 Brothers Znamensky Memorial was held in Tula, Russia

Series winners
In addition to event-level winners decided after the IAAF Grand Prix Final, the male and female athletes with the highest points scores across ally events were crowned the overall IAAF Grand Prix winners. Prize money was awarded to the eight top-scoring athletes on the circuit, with first prize being US$200,000 in 1998.

References

External links
IAAF World Athletics Tour

 
Grand Prix
Annual athletics series
IAAF World Athletics Tour
Defunct athletics competitions
Recurring sporting events established in 1985
Recurring sporting events disestablished in 2009